Javier Martín-Torres (born 27 July 1970) is a Spanish physicist with interests in atmospheric sciences (mainly Earth, Mars, and exoplanet atmospheres), geophysics, and astrobiology. He has published over 100 scientific papers in these areas.
	
He is a chaired professor in Planetary Sciences at the University of Aberdeen, UK, and Senior Research Scientist of the Spanish Research Council, assigned to the Instituto Andaluz de Ciencias de la Tierra, located in Armilla, Granada, Spain. He is also a visiting professor at the School of Physics and Astronomy at the University of Edinburgh, a Specially Appointed Professor at Okayama University. Previously he has worked for ESA, the California Institute of Technology, Lunar and Planetary Laboratory, and 10 years for NASA at the Langley Research Center and Jet Propulsion Laboratory.

Mars research

Martin-Torres is the principal investigator of the HABIT (HabitAbility: Brine, Irradiation and Temperature) instrument, which will travel to Mars as part of the scientific payload of the ExoMars 2020 mission to investigate, amongst other things, the water exchange cycle between the atmosphere and the Martian regolith. 
	
Martin-Torres is also a Co-I on the Mars Science Laboratory/Curiosity rover, ExoMars Trace Gas Orbiter ACS instrument, and ISEM/ExoMars rover.

Transient liquid water on Mars

 	
The article Transient liquid water and water activity at Gale crater on Mars, reported the existence of a daily cycle of water exchange between the atmospheric boundary layer and the ground, including a phase during which the water remains in a transient liquid state. This is possible thanks to the presence in the soil of perchlorates, a highly hygroscopic kind of chlorine salts which seem to be ubiquitous over the Martian surface. These salts have the capability of catching water vapour from the environment up to the point of becoming solved in it forming concentrated solutions or brines. It is an extreme case of hygroscopy known as deliquescence.
	
The eutectic temperature of these brines allows its permanence in liquid state under the registered Martian environmental conditions in the study area of Curiosity, close to the equator, where they are the least favourable for this to happen. Therefore, it is expected that the phenomenon is more intense in terms of duration of the liquid phase in higher latitudes.
 	
The presence of liquid water on present day Mars entails transcendent consequences in a number of aspects of the planet's exploration. Firstly, it casts a new light on the comprehension of Martian environment, and can be the key to understand some morphological features of the surface, such as the so-called Recurrent Slope Lineae (RSLs). In addition, the discovery has posed the necessity for taking special precautions to avoid biological contamination of the planet with terrestrial organisms carried on board the spacecraft to be sent in the next missions, since the availability of liquid water multiply the possibilities for them to survive and thrive in certain places. Finally, water can be a valuable in-situ resource at the disposal of a crew which is eventually sent to Mars someday.
 	
However, the brines themselves have not been monitored yet, and a quantification of the phenomenon is still missing. This is what the Brine Observation Transition to Liquid Experiment (BOTTLE, one of the units composing HABIT instrument) is being developed for.

Radiative Transfer modelling

Martin-Torres has developed non-Local Thermodynamic Equilibrium models to explain the emissions of some of the main emitters in the infrared (ozone, methane, nitric oxide, hydroxyl, dinitrogen monoxide, nitrogen dioxide); and has been part of the Science Team of MIPAS/Envisat, SABER/TIMED, and Orbiting Carbon Observatory.
 	
Martin-Torres is author of the line-by radiative transfer code FUTBOLIN (FUll Transfer By Optimized LINe by line), which is widely used to model radiative processes in the atmosphere. It has been used to model the Earth's atmosphere and the atmospheres like those of Mars, Venus, and Titan, and simulations of Earthshine for exoplanet applications.

Fight against COVID-19 

During the 2020 COVID pandemic, Martin-Torres led the Department of Planetary Sciences Team to build a ventilator to help treat the most severe cases of coronavirus. The Team used their skills to develop life support systems for crewed space missions for this development.
A ventilator is used to take over the body's breathing process when the disease caused a patient's lungs to fail 

The Aberdeen device was called ATMO-Vent (Atmospheric Mixture Optimization Ventilator).

Greenhouse Gas Regulation: NF3 as a greenhouse gas 
In 2020 Martin-Torres elaborated the state-of-the-art scientific report about NF3 as a greenhouse gas that was attached to the legal brief submitted by Dr Thomas Muinzer 
University of Aberdeen, Javier Martin-Torres, and the Scottish Climate Emergency Legal Network, to request that NF3 was included as a greenhouse gas in UK regulations. As a result of this brief, in 2023, the UK Government will amend the UK Climate Change Act to include NF3 as a greenhouse gas.

Selected publications

F. Javier Martín-Torres and María-Paz Zorzano, The Fate of Freedom of a Space Exploration Mission Encountering Life and the Liberty of the “Encountered” Extra-Terrestrial Beings, chapter of the book The Meaning of Liberty Beyond Earth, Space and Society Series, Springer International Publishing; 2015 edition, .
F. J. Martín-Torres and J. F. Buenestado, ¿Qué sabemos de la vida en el Universo?,  Editorial: CSIC y Catarata, Páginas: 128, 2013 
Martín-Torres F. J., and A. Delgado-Bonal, A Mathematic Approach to Nitrogen Fixation Through Earth History, chapter of book Nitrogen in Planetary Systems: The Early Evolution of Atmospheres of Terrestrial Planets, Springer-Verlag, 2013.
Trigo-Rodríguez, J. M. and F. J. Martín-Torres, Implication of Impacts in the Young Earth Sun Paradox and the Evolution of Earth's Atmosphere, chapter of book Nitrogen in Planetary Systems: The Early Evolution of Atmospheres of Terrestrial Planets, Springer-Verlag, 2013.
Co-author in book as part of the Venus Entry Probe Team, Venus Entry Probe Workshop, Note du Pole de Planetologie, Institut Pierre Simon Laplace des Sciences de l’Environnement Global, ISSN 1768-0042, 2006.

References 

 	
	

Spanish physicists
1970 births
Living people
Atmospheric physicists
Geophysicists
Astrobiologists
Academics of the University of Edinburgh
Academic staff of the Luleå University of Technology
Academics of the University of Aberdeen
Atmospheric scientists